The Parliament of Rwanda (French: Parlement du Rwanda; Kinyarwanda: Inteko Ishinga Amategeko y’u Rwanda) has consisted of two chambers since 2003:

The Senate (French: Sénat; Kinyarwanda: Sena) (Upper Chamber)
The Chamber of Deputies (French: Chambre des députés; Kinyarwanda: Umutwe w’Abadepite) (Lower Chamber)

Legislative History

National Assembly 1961–1973
Rwanda had a unicameral legislature, National Assembly of Rwanda, established in January 1961. It was dissolved following the coup d'état of 1973.

National Development Council, 1982–1994
Rwanda had a unicameral legislature, National Development Council of Rwanda from 1982 to 1994.

Transitional National Assembly, 1994–2003
Unicameral Transitional National Assembly of Rwanda was established in 1994 following Rwandan Civil War. It was replaced in 2003 by a bicameral legislature.

Women in Parliament 
Rwanda's parliament has the highest percentage of women in a single house parliament worldwide. The government has reserved 24 out of the 80 seats in the Chamber of Deputies for women. The 24 seats allocated to women are divided up between each province and the city of Kigali, where they are elected by an assembly made up of various councils and committees members.

More women were granted seats due to the effects of the Rwandan Genocide on the population. After the Genocide against the Tutsi, the population was made up of more women than men, and this was reflected in the makeup of Parliament.

See also
Politics of Rwanda

References

 
Government of Rwanda
Rwanda
Rwanda
Rwanda